The Mole Agent is a 2020 internationally co-produced documentary film directed by Maite Alberdi. It was screened at the 2020 Sundance Film Festival in the World Cinema Documentary Competition. At the 93rd Academy Awards, It was nominated for the Academy Award for Best Documentary Feature and was selected as the Chilean entry for Best International Feature Film, making the shortlist of fifteen films.

Synopsis
A private investigator (Rómulo) hires an elderly man (Sergio) to go undercover in a nursing home in El Monte, Chile. Rómulo's client alleges that her mother, Sonia, is being mistreated by the nursing home staff. 

Sergio poses as a new resident of the nursing home to investigate these claims. During his stay, he interacts with several residents, including Berta, Marta, and Rubeira. Berta, who has lived in the nursing home for twenty-five years and has never been married, becomes infatuated with Sergio and even expresses her desire to marry him to the home's director. Marta, who suffers from dementia, frequently asks strangers passing by to take her to her mother's house. Sergio discovers that Marta steals other residents' belongings, including Sonia's. At one point, Marta escapes but is eventually brought back by the police. Rubeira also suffers from memory loss and longs to see her children and grandchildren. Sergio requests photographs of them from Rómulo and shows them to Rubeira.

After conducting his investigation, Sergio concludes that Sonia is being treated well, except for one instance when the nurses forget to give her medication. He informs Rómulo that no crimes are being committed and returns home to his family in Santiago.

Release
The film had its world premiere at the Sundance Film Festival on 25 January 2020. In August 2020, Gravitas Ventures acquired US distribution rights to the film, and set it for a 1 September 2020 release. The film was released in the Netherlands on 10 December 2020 by Cinema Delicatessen. It was broadcast on PBS in the United States on 25 January 2021 as part of their POV program.

Reception

Critical response 
The critical consensus reads "Warm and funny, The Mole Agent offers audiences a poignant reminder that it's never too late to forge new connections and embark on new adventures." On Metacritic the film has a weighted average score of 69 out of 100, based on 13 critics, indicating "generally favorable reviews".

Glenn Kenny of The New York Times gave the film a positive review commenting: "The film’s people are moving, and the payoff is compassionate, humane and worth heeding.". Nick Allen of RogerEbert.com rated the movie three stars out of four writing: "The documentary succeeds with its tenderness, while vividly reminding us how easily society can forget its elders."

Awards and nominations
The Mole Agent has received several awards and nominations. The documentary was the Chilean entry for the Goya Award for Best Iberoamerican Film, becoming the eighteenth Chilean nomination in that category since its creation and the second for Alberdi after La once was nominated in 2015. At the 93rd Academy Awards, the film was nominated for Best Documentary Feature (losing to My Octopus Teacher), and also made the shortlist for Best International Feature Film.

Television adaptation
In March 2023, it was announced that Netflix had ordered a television series adaptation of the film with Michael Schur executive produce and Ted Danson star.

See also
 List of submissions to the 93rd Academy Awards for Best International Feature Film
 List of Chilean submissions for the Academy Award for Best International Feature Film

References

External links
 
 Official trailer
 Homepage

2020 films
2020 documentary films
Chilean documentary films
American documentary films
Spanish documentary films
German documentary films
2020s Spanish-language films
Documentary films about old age
2020s American films
2020s Spanish films
2020s Chilean films